Ectatomma is a Neotropical genus of ants in the subfamily Ectatomminae. The genus contains 17 described extant species and one extinct species.

Distribution and habitat
Ectatomma is one of the most common genera in the Neotropical region, with most species being South American in their distribution, but others can be found in Central America as well as sparse populations in the Caribbean. Ectatomma may be found in rainforests, savannas, dry environments and cultivated areas.

Species

Ectatomma brunneum Smith, 1858
Ectatomma confine Mayr, 1870
Ectatomma edentatum Roger, 1863
Ectatomma gibbum Kugler & Brown, 1982 
Ectatomma goninion Kugler & Brown, 1982
 †Ectatomma gracile Emery, 1891
Ectatomma lugens Emery, 1894
Ectatomma muticum Mayr, 1870
Ectatomma opaciventre (Roger, 1861)
Ectatomma parasiticum Feitosa & Fresneau, 2008
Ectatomma permagnum Forel, 1908
Ectatomma planidens Borgmeier, 1939
Ectatomma quadridens (Fabricius, 1793)
Ectatomma ruidum (Roger, 1860)
Ectatomma suzanae Almeida Filho, 1986
Ectatomma tuberculatum (Olivier, 1792)
Ectatomma vizottoi Almeida Filho, 1987

See also
Pseudectatomma, meaning "false Ectatomma", extinct genus of ants

References

External links

Ectatomminae
Ant genera
Hymenoptera of South America
Hymenoptera of North America